Lutín is a municipality and village in Olomouc District in the Olomouc Region of the Czech Republic. It has about 3,200 inhabitants.

Administrative parts
The village of Třebčín is an administrative part of Lutín.

Geography
It is located in the Upper Morava Valley.

History

The first written mention of Lutín is from 1234. Třebčín was first mentioned in 1131.

Economy
Lutín has a tradition of pumpmaking industry. A pumpmaking manufacture was founded here by Ludvík Sigmund in 1868 and later became the biggest producer of pumps in the country. Since 1965, the company has been known as Sigma Lutín. In 1966, the company became a sponsor of the club SK Sigma Olomouc.

Sights
The most valuable monuments are a statue of an angel from 1788 and the Chapel of Saint Florian.

References

External links

Villages in Olomouc District